National Route 497 is a national highway of Japan connecting between Hakata-ku, Fukuoka and Takeo, Saga in Japan, with total length has 63.5 km (39.5 mi).

References

497

ja:西九州自動車道#国道497号